Congregation B'rith Sholem Synagogue is a historic synagogue in Ogden, Utah. It was built in 1921, three decades after the first Jewish residents of Ogden began meeting at Ben Oppman's Clothing Store on 25th Street. It has been listed on the National Register of Historic Places since June 27, 1985.

References

Buildings and structures completed in 1921
National Register of Historic Places in Weber County, Utah
Synagogues on the National Register of Historic Places in Utah
1921 establishments in Utah